Pasvik (also known as Paatsjoki in Finnish and Kven languages) is a village in Northern Norway adjacent to the Norway-Russia border. Most of the time, its subarctic climate is very cold.

See also
Øvre Pasvik National Park

References

Villages in Finnmark